Pietrangelo is both an Italian surname and given name. Notable people with the name include:

 Alex Pietrangelo (born 1990), Canadian ice hockey defenceman
 Amelia Pietrangelo (born 1993), Canadian soccer striker
 Frank Pietrangelo (born 1964), Canadian ice hockey goaltender
 Pietrangelo Pettenò (born 1960), Italian politician from Veneto

it:Pietrangelo

Italian-language surnames